Diadegma basale is a wasp first described by Horstmann in 1980.
No subspecies are listed.

References

basale
Insects described in 1980